The 2018 MTN 8 was the 44th edition of South Africa's annual soccer cup competition, the MTN 8. It featured the top eight teams of the Premier Soccer League at the end of the 2017-18 season.

Teams
The eight teams that competed in the MTN 8 knockout competition are (listed according to their finishing position in the 2017/2018 Premier Soccer League Season):
 1. Mamelodi Sundowns
 2. Orlando Pirates
 3. Kaizer Chiefs
 4. Maritzburg United
 5. Cape Town City
 6. Free State Stars
 7. SuperSport United
 8. Golden Arrows

Quarter-finals

Semi-finals

1st Leg

2nd Leg

Final

References

MTN 8
2018–19 in South African soccer
2018 domestic association football cups